Chris Farren may refer to:
Chris Farren (country musician), American country musician
Chris Farren (punk musician) (born 1986), American punk musician